Alice Jolly (born 1966) is an English novelist, playwright and memoirist, who has won both the Royal Society of Literature’s V. S. Pritchett Memorial Prize for short stories (2014) and the PEN/Ackerley Prize for autobiography (2016).

Her novel Mary Ann Sate, Imbecile was runner up for The Rathbones Folio Prize in 2019 and was also longlisted for The Ondaatje Prize also in 2019.

She was awarded an O. Henry Award in 2021. She reviews for The Times Literary Supplement, The Literary Review and The Guardian.

Biography
Jolly graduated from Worcester College, Oxford with a degree in Modern History in 1989.

She teaches on the Creative Writing M.St. course at the University of Oxford.

In 2014, Jolly was awarded the Royal Society of Literature's V.S. Pritchett Memorial Prize for her short story, Ray the Rottweiler.
In 2016, she was awarded the PEN/Ackerley Prize for her memoir, Dead Babies and Seaside Towns, the publication of which was crowdfunded.

Her novel Mary Ann Sate, Imbecile was runner up for The Rathbones Folio Prize in 2019 and was also longlisted for The Ondaatje Prize also in 2019.

She was awarded an O. Henry Award in 2021. She reviews for The Times Literary Supplement, The Literary Review and The Guardian.

Jolly is married to a lawyer, Stephen Kinsella. They have two children, Thomas and Hope, and live in Gloucestershire.

Published works
 What the Eye Doesn’t See (Simon & Schuster, 2003)
 If Only You Knew (Simon & Schuster, 2006)
 Dead Babies and Seaside Towns (Unbound, 2015)  is a memoir of Jolly's journey of using a surrogate to carry her second child.
 Mary Ann Sate, Imbecile (Unbound, 2018)
 Between the Regions of Kindness (Unbound 2019)
 A Saint in Swindon (Fairlight, 2020).  

Jolly has also written a number of plays for the Everyman Theatre, Cheltenham and the Cheltenham Literature Festival.

References

External links
 Alice Jolly's personal web-site

1966 births
Living people
English memoirists
21st-century English novelists
English dramatists and playwrights
Alumni of Worcester College, Oxford
21st-century English women writers
21st-century English writers
British women memoirists